The Consulate General of Malaysia for Southern India is one of the three missions of Malaysia in India focusing on Malaysian interests in the region. It is located in Chennai and its jurisdiction includes the states of Tamil Nadu, Andhra Pradesh, Telangana, Karnataka, Kerala and the union territory of Puducherry. The other two are the Malaysian High Commission in New Delhi and the Consulate General of Malaysia in Mumbai, in addition to an honorary office in Kolkata. The current Consul General of the Chennai Consulate is Saravana Kumar Kumaravasagam.

Location of agencies
The Office of the Consulate General of Malaysia is located at No.7 (Old 3) Cenotaph Road 1st Street, Teynampet. Other offices operating under the Consulate General are Immigration agency, the Education and Training section (Public Services Department) and the Ministry of Human Resources. The Tourism Malaysia agency functions at 4 Kodambakkam High Road, Nungambakkam. The MATRADE office—the office of the Malaysia External Trade Development Corporation, the national trade promotion agency of Malaysia—operates from 554 and 555, Anna Salai, Teynampet. The Malaysian Airlines functions from Temple Tower No.672, Anna Salai, Nandanam.

History
The Consulate General of Malaysia for Southern India in Chennai was established in 1961 as the Office of the Assistant High Commissioner for Malaysia in Chennai. The mission in Chennai is considered one of the first few Malaysian diplomatic missions established abroad following the establishment of Indian diplomatic relations with the Federation of Malaya (predecessor state of Malaysia) in 1957. and the Independence of Malaysia in the same year.

In November 2004, the Chennai mission was upgraded as the Consulate General of Malaysia for Southern India in Chennai by the Government of Malaysia through the notification issued by the Indian Ministry of External Affairs on 8 November 2004 in order to cater to the greater interests of Malaysia in the region by optimizing the role of the mission.

List of Assistant High Commissioners/Consul Generals
Until the upgradation in 2004 as the Consulate General, the mission had Assistant High Commissioners heading it. Since 2004, the mission is being led by consul generals. Below is the list of Assistant High Commissioners/Consul Generals of the Consulate General of Malaysia in Chennai:

Assistant high commissioners
 T. H. Yogaratnam (1961–1964)
 Razali Ismail (1964–1966)
 Anaitullah B. Karim (1966–1969)
 Alfred Kumarasari (1970–1972)
 Kon Song Chee (1973 (6 months))
 Dominic Mathews (1973–1974)
 Low Tiam Kit (1974–1976)
 Tuan Hj. Gulam Haniff (1976–1979)
 Marzuki Mohd Noor (1980–1982)
 Fauzi Yon (1982–1985)
 Abdul Latif Awang (1985–1988)
 Mahalil Hj. Baharam (1988–1992)
 Shafie Abu Samah (1992–1996)
 Ismail Ahmad (1997)
 Mazlan Muhammad (1997–2001)
 Y. M. Raja Ahmad Raja Daud (2001–2004)

Consul generals
 Rosli B. Ismail (2004–2007)
 Anuar Kasman (22 April 2008 – 2012)
 Chitra Devi Ramiah (2012 – January 2016)
 Ahmad Fajarazam bin Abdul Jalil (January 2016 – August 2017)
 Saravanan Karathihayan (January 2018 – November 2022)
 Saravana Kumar Kumaravasagam (November 2022 – present)

Mission statement
The stated mission of the Consulate General of Malaysia in Chennai is as follows:
 Uphold the country's sovereignty and promote universal peace
 Foster friendly relations with foreign countries
 Develop and protect Malaysia's interests in the regional and international arena
 Ensure the safety and interests of Malaysians abroad
 Extend excellent and efficient services to the Ministry's stakeholders both locally and abroad

Functions
The mission is headed by 18 diplomatic officers assigned by the Malaysian Ministry of Foreign Affairs. With the expansion to include various core areas, the office of the Consulate General is assisted by several agencies under the umbrella of the Consulate General to execute specific duties:

Along with the Malaysian High Commission in New Delhi, the Consulate General in Chennai processes visa applications from Indian visitors. As of 2009, the Consulate General in Chennai issues more than 350 visas a day, including employment and tourist visas. The visa application centre in Chennai was established in 2011. Other visa applications centres are in Mumbai, New Delhi, Kolkata and Hyderabad.

PERWAKILAN Chennai
The Ladies Association of the Consulate General of Malaysia in Chennai is known as PERWAKILAN Chennai. PERWAKILAN is an acronym of "Persatuan Wanita Kementerian Luar Negeri" meaning the "Malaysian Ministry of Foreign Affairs Ladies Association". It is a voluntary non-profit organization and was established following the establishment of the Consulate General.  It is currently chaired by Mrs Visalakshi Suparamaiam, wife of the Consul General. Membership is automatically opened to wives of home-based staff of the Malaysian Consulate General Office and Malaysian Governmental Agencies in Chennai.

See also

 List of diplomatic missions in Chennai
 List of diplomatic missions of Malaysia
 Foreign relations of Malaysia
 India–Malaysia relations
 Foreign relations of India

References

External links
 Official website of the Malaysian Consulate General Chennai
 Homepage of PERWAKILAN Chennai
 Homepage of Matrade

Diplomatic missions in India
Malaysia
Organisations based in Chennai
Chennai
India–Malaysia relations
1961 establishments in Madras State